A Zeiss projector is one of a line of planetarium projectors manufactured by the Carl Zeiss Company.
Main models include Copernican (1924), Model I (1925), Model II (1926), Model III (1957), Model IV (1957), Model V (1965), Model VI (1968), Spacemaster (1970), Cosmorana (1984), Skymaster ZKP2 (1977), and Skymaster ZKP3 (1993).

The first modern planetarium projectors were designed and built in 1924 by the Zeiss Works of Jena, Germany in 1924. Zeiss projectors are designed to sit in the middle of a dark, dome-covered room and project an accurate image of the stars and other astronomical objects on the dome.  They are generally large, complicated, and imposing machines.

The first Zeiss Mark I projector (the first planetarium projector in the world) was installed in the Deutsches Museum in Munich in August, 1923. It possessed a distinctive appearance, with a single sphere of projection lenses supported above a large, angled "planet cage".  Marks II through VI were similar in appearance, using two spheres of star projectors separated along a central axis that contained projectors for the planets.  Beginning with Mark VII, the central axis was eliminated and the two spheres were merged into a single, egg-shaped projection unit.

History of development and production

The Mark I was created in 1923–1924 and was the world's first modern planetarium projector. The Mark II was developed during the 1930s by Carl Zeiss AG in Jena. Following WWII division of Germany and the founding of Carl Zeiss (West Germany) in Oberkochen (while the original Jena plant was located in East Germany), each factory developed its own line of projectors.

Marks III – VI were developed in Oberkochen (West Germany) from 1957 to 1989.  Meanwhile, the East German facility in Jena developed the ZKP projector line. The Mark VII was developed in 1993 and was the first joint project of the two Zeiss factories following German reunification.

, Zeiss currently manufactures three main models of planetarium projectors. The flagship Universarium models continue the "Mark" model designation and use a single "starball" design, where the fixed stars are projected from a single egg-shaped projector, and moving objects such as planets have their own independent projectors or are projected using a full-dome digital projection system. The Starmaster line of projectors are designed for smaller domes than the Universarium, but also use the single starball design. The Skymaster ZKP projectors are designed for the smallest domes and use a "dumbbell" design similar to the Mark II-VI projectors, where two smaller starballs for the northern and southern hemispheres are connected by a truss containing projectors for planets and other moving objects.

List of planetariums that have featured a Zeiss projector

Between 1923 and 2011, Zeiss manufactured a total of 631 projectors. Therefore, the following table is highly incomplete.

See also
 List of planetariums
 Planetarium
 Planetarium Jena
 Walther Bauersfeld

References

External links

 Zeiss Planetariums

Planetarium projection
Carl Zeiss AG